James Prioleau "Dick" Richards (August 31, 1894 – February 21, 1979) was a lawyer, judge, and Democrat U.S. Representative from South Carolina between 1933 and 1957.  He later served as a special ambassador under Republican President Dwight D. Eisenhower.

Background
Born in Liberty Hill, South Carolina, Richards attended in-state county schools and Clemson College, in Clemson.

Career

During the First World War, Richards served overseas as a private, corporal, sergeant, and second lieutenant in the Trench Mortar Battery, Headquarters Company, 118th Infantry Regiment, 30th Division from 1917 to 1919.

Lawyer and judge
Richards graduated from the law department of the University of South Carolina at Columbia in 1921 and was admitted to the bar the same year, commencing practice in Lancaster, South Carolina. He served as judge of the probate court of Lancaster County, South Carolina, from 1923 to 1933.

Congressman
Richards was elected as a Democrat to the seventy-third Congress and reelected to the eleven succeeding Congresses (March 4, 1933 – January 3, 1957).

A confidential 1943 analysis of the House Foreign Affairs Committee by Isaiah Berlin for the British Foreign Office described Richards as having "supported the Administration on foreign policy before and after Pearl Harbour all the way with the single exception of the vote on lifting belligerent zones for American ships three weeks before Pearl Harbour ... Probably internationalist rather than nationalist in outlook." His voting record was "consistently pro-British." He voted in favor of the 1941 Lend Lease Act and in favor of the 1944 Lend Lease Act. In 1947-8, he served on the Herter Committee.   During the Eighty-second and Eighty-fourth Congresses he served as chairman of the Committee on Foreign Affairs. In 1953 Richards served as delegate to the Japanese Peace Conference and United States delegate to the United Nations. Hoping to retire from Congress, he was not a candidate for reelection in 1956 to the Eighty-fifth Congress.

He was a signatory to the 1956 Southern Manifesto that opposed the desegregation of public schools ordered by the Supreme Court in Brown v. Board of Education.

Later life
He served as special assistant to President Eisenhower, January 1957-January 1958, for the Middle East, following announcement of the Eisenhower Doctrine.  With this position, Richards held rank of ambassador. Following this, he resided in Lancaster, South Carolina, and resumed the practice of law.

Death
Richards died there on February 21, 1979, and was interred in Liberty Hill Presbyterian Church Cemetery, Liberty Hill, S. C.

References

1894 births
1979 deaths
United States Army officers
Democratic Party members of the United States House of Representatives from South Carolina
20th-century American politicians
University of South Carolina alumni
People from Kershaw County, South Carolina
Military personnel from South Carolina
American segregationists